Anuar Kanan Gonzalez (born April 5, 1995) is a Mexican footballer.

References

External links 
 

1995 births
Living people
Footballers from Puebla
Expatriate soccer players in the United States
Mexican expatriates in the United States
Jamestown Jimmies men's soccer players
Young Harris Mountain Lions men's soccer players
Dayton Dutch Lions players
Las Vegas Lights FC players
USL Championship players
Association football forwards
Mexican footballers